Rhein (pronounced 'Ryan') is a village in the Canadian province of Saskatchewan within the Rural Municipality of Wallace No. 243 and Census Division No. 9.

History 
Rhein incorporated as a village on March 10, 1913.

Demographics 

Economy 
Commercial cultivation of industrial cannabis was banned in Canada in 1938, but as of 1928 1,640 acres of cannabis were grown in Canada, with 200 of those acres located in Rhein.

Notable residents
Rhein was the hometown of Arnie Weinmeister, one of the only two Canadians to be elected to the Pro Football Hall of Fame. 

Established Ukrainian-Canadian fiddler (the late) Bill Prokopchuk, who recorded several albums and appeared in the 1979 NFB film "Paper Wheat," was born in Rhein in 1925.

See also
 List of communities in Saskatchewan
 Hamlets of Saskatchewan

References

Villages in Saskatchewan
Wallace No. 243, Saskatchewan
Division No. 9, Saskatchewan